The Bones of a Dying World is the third studio album by American post-rock band If These Trees Could Talk. It was released on June 3, 2016 through Metal Blade Records. The album was produced by drummer Zack Kelly. The album was announced in late April 2016 alongside premiere track "Solstice". Subsequently, debuted in May 2016 were tracks "Earth Crawler" and "Berlin".

Track listing

Personnel
 Tom Fihe – bass
 Jeff Kalal – guitar
 Cody Kelly – guitar
 Mike Socrates – guitar
 Zack Kelly – drums

References

2016 albums
If These Trees Could Talk albums
Metal Blade Records albums